The women's discus throw at the 1978 European Athletics Championships was held in Prague, then Czechoslovakia, at Stadion Evžena Rošického on 31 August 1978.

Medalists

Results

Final
31 August

Participation
According to an unofficial count, 14 athletes from 9 countries participated in the event.

 (1)
 (2)
 (3)
 (1)
 (1)
 (3)
 (1)
 (1)
 (1)

References

Discus throw
Discus throw at the European Athletics Championships
1978 in women's athletics